Medinilla beamanii is a species in the genus Medinilla of the family Melastomataceae.

Etymology
Medinilla is named for José de Medinilla y Pineda, who was governor of Mauritius (then known as the Marianne Islands) in 1820.
The species is named after John H. Beaman who first collected it in flower.

Description
Medinilla beamanii is a large evergreen shrub. The bright pink small flowers are produced in large panicles on pendant reddish stems. Fruits are rounded pink berries turning  reddish when ripe.

Distribution
This plant is native to the island of Borneo.

Habitat

References

Medinilla beamanii; J.C. Regalado; in Blumea 35: 29. 1990
 Catalogue of Life
 Zipcodezoo

External links
 Nature Love You

beamanii
Flora of Borneo
Plants described in 1990